Gérald Coppenrath (22 April 1922 – 4 November 2008) was a French senator and journalist. Coppenrath was the French senator for Tahiti between 1958 and 1962.

Born in Papeete, Tahiti he moved to France and studied at the University of Poitiers. He later returned to Tahiti in 1948. In November 1957 he was elected to the Assembly in the Windward Islands constituency as a member of the Tahitian Union. On 8 June 1958 he was elected senator, winning by 13 votes to 11. He was re-elected on 26 April 1959, when he won by 43 votes against 17. He stayed in office until 1962. He was voted the first president of his former university in 1972.

He was the older brother of Hubert and Michel Coppenrath. Both became Archbishops. Michel died on 18 August 2008.

Coppenrath died on 4 November 2008. Three months after his younger brother.

References 

1922 births
2008 deaths
French Polynesian politicians
Members of the Assembly of French Polynesia
French Polynesian journalists
People from Papeete
French Senators of the Fifth Republic
French male non-fiction writers
Senators of French Polynesia
20th-century French journalists
20th-century French male writers
French Polyensian expatriates in France